Yuri Iosifovich Vizbor (June 20, 1934 – September 17, 1984) was a Soviet bard and poet as well as a theatre and film actor.

Vizbor was born in Moscow where he lived for most of his life. He worked as a teacher, a soldier, a sailor, a radio and press correspondent, a ski instructor, and an actor in many Russian films and plays. He participated in and documented expeditions to remote areas of the Soviet Union. His compositions included songs, poetic prose, plays, screenplays and short stories.

Early years
Vizbor's father, a commander in the Red Army, was of Lithuanian descent. His family name was originally Vizbaras. His mother was an ethnic Ukrainian from Krasnodar. In 1937, his father fell victim to Stalin's purges. In 1941, Yuri and his mother moved to Siberia. This period influenced the artist's distaste for politics and his fascination with the wilderness.

In 1951, he graduated from high school and after several failed attempts to start studies in several high-ranking universities (he was denied the place as the "son of the enemy of the People") was accepted as a student of the Moscow State Pedagogical Institute. It was here that he wrote his first song, entitled "Madagascar".

Professional activities
After graduating with a degree in Russian language and literature in 1955, Vizbor worked as a teacher in Arkhangelsk. In 1957 he was conscripted to the army where he worked as a radio operator. He married in 1958. In the late 1950s and early 1960s Vizbor began to acquire fame as a songwriter by circulating homemade tapes.

Vizbor is often compared with his contemporaries, Vladimir Vysotsky and Bulat Okudzhava. The topics of Vizbor's songs were observational, focusing on his love of nature and of travel. By using his extremely varied professions as a template, Vizbor attempted to document various aspects of "normal life" at the height of Brezhnev's era of stagnation. His trademark was a relaxed singing style that often sounded on the verge of laughter. Vizbor recorded songs with a traditional Russian seven-string guitar that was often slightly out of tune.

While most Russian bards relied on a rhythmic strumming pattern as the basis for their musical accompaniment, Vizbor was fond of a slow plucking style epitomized by songs such as "Fanskie Gory". His best-known tune was a romantic ballad called "Milaya Moya" or "My Dear." On a more somber note, his song "Seryoga Sanin" told the story of a free spirited friend who dies tragically.

Illness and death
In March 1984, Vizbor wrote his last song, having written over 250 of them during the past thirty-three years. His poetry had also been set to music by numerous musicians. His last writings were letters to his daughter from his sickbed while he lay dying of liver cancer from April to September 1984.

Filmography

Legacy
A minor planet 3260 Vizbor discovered by Soviet astronomer Lyudmila Zhuravlyova in 1974 is named after him.

Discography
My Little Sun of Forest, 1998

References

External links

1934 births
1984 deaths
Burials at Kuntsevo Cemetery
Moscow State Pedagogical University alumni
Russian bards
Soviet songwriters
Soviet musicians
Russian people of Lithuanian descent
Soviet people of Lithuanian descent
Seven-string guitarists
Soviet male actors
Soviet poets
Russian male poets
Soviet male writers
20th-century Russian male writers
Soviet male singer-songwriters
20th-century guitarists
20th-century Russian male singers
20th-century Russian singers
Deaths from liver cancer
Deaths from cancer in Russia
Singers from Moscow
Male actors from Moscow